The 2018 Varsity Shield was the 8th season of the Varsity Shield, the second-tier competition in the annual Varsity Rugby series. It was played between 19 February and 9 April 2018 and featured seven university teams.

Competition rules and information

There were seven participating university teams in the 2019 Varsity Shield. They played each other once during the pool stage, either at home or away. Teams received four points for a win and two points for a draw. Bonus points were awarded to teams that scored four or more tries in a game, as well as to teams that lost a match by seven points or less. Teams were ranked by log points, then points difference (points scored less points conceded).

The top four teams after the pool stage qualified for the semifinals, which were followed by a final.

Teams

The teams that played in the 2018 Varsity Shield were:

Pool stage

Standings

The final log for the 2018 Varsity Shield was:

Round-by-round

The table below shows a team's progression throughout the season. For each round, each team's cumulative points total is shown with the overall log position in brackets.

Matches

The following matches were played in the 2018 Varsity Shield:

Round one

Round two

Round three

Round four

Round five

Round six

Round seven

Play-offs

Semifinals

Final

See also

 2018 Varsity Cup
 2018 Varsity Rugby

References

2018
2018 in South African rugby union
2018 rugby union tournaments for clubs